State Road 512 (NM 512) is a  state highway in the US state of New Mexico. NM 512's western terminus is at U.S. Route 64 (US 64) and US 84 in Brazos, and the eastern terminus is at the end of state maintenance near Corkins Lodge.

Major intersections

See also

References

512
Transportation in Rio Arriba County, New Mexico